Xiazhou or Xia Prefecture (Chinese: Xiàzhōu 夏州;) was a zhou (prefecture) in imperial China centering on modern Jingbian County, Shaanxi, China. It existed (intermittently) from 487 to early 13th century, when the Mongolian Yuan dynasty destroyed Western Xia (1038–1227). In the 10th-, 11th and 12th-centuries it was mostly controlled by the Tangut people as part of Western Xia or its precursor, the Dingnan Jiedushi.

Geography
The administrative region of Xiazhou during the Tang dynasty is in the border area of modern northern Shaanxi and southern Inner Mongolia. It probably includes parts of modern: 
 Under the administration of Yulin, Shaanxi:
 Jingbian County
 Under the administration of Ordos City, Inner Mongolia:
 Uxin Banner
 Hanggin Banner

References

 

Prefectures of the Sui dynasty
Prefectures of the Tang dynasty
Prefectures of the Song dynasty
Prefectures of Western Xia
Former prefectures in Shaanxi
Former prefectures in Inner Mongolia